The 2009–10 season was Hapoel Tel Aviv's 69th season in Israeli Premier League, and their 20th consecutive season in the top division of Israeli football.

The season was a great success for the club winning both the league and Israel State Cup.

UEFA Europa League

Qualification

Group C

Knockout phase

Ligat Ha'Al (Premier League)

Regular season

Top playoff

State Cup

Toto Cup

Pld = Matches played; W = Matches won; D = Matches drawn; L = Matches lost; F = Goals for; A = Goals against; GD = Goal difference; Pts = Points

Hapoel Tel Aviv F.C. seasons
Hapoel Tel Aviv
Hapoel Tel Aviv